The Brookport Bridge (officially the Irvin S. Cobb Bridge) is a ten-span, steel deck (grate), narrow two-lane truss bridge that carries U.S. Route 45 (US 45) across the Ohio River in the U.S. states of Illinois and Kentucky. It connects Paducah, Kentucky, north to Brookport, Illinois.

The bridge is named after Irvin S. Cobb, an author and journalist who was born in Paducah. The bridge was originally built by a private company and operated as a toll bridge. The state of Kentucky subsequently purchased the bridge from its builders.

The bridge is notoriously difficult to cross, due to its very narrow lanes and steel grate deck. The nearby Interstate 24 Bridge can be used instead.

See also
 
 
 
 
 List of crossings of the Ohio River

References

External links
Brookport-Paducah Bridge at Bridges & Tunnels (archive)
BrookportBridge.com - Shows if the bridge is open or closed during winter weather. (archive)
Brookport Bridge details on historicbridges.org (archive)

Bridges over the Ohio River
Road bridges in Illinois
Road bridges in Kentucky
Steel bridges in the United States
Truss bridges in the United States
Bridges of the United States Numbered Highway System
U.S. Route 45
Buildings and structures in Massac County, Illinois
Buildings and structures in Paducah, Kentucky
Bridges completed in 1929
Transportation in Massac County, Illinois
Transportation in McCracken County, Kentucky
1929 establishments in Kentucky
1929 establishments in Illinois